1947–48 was the thirty-fifth occasion on which the Lancashire Cup completion had been held.

Wigan won the trophy  by beating Belle Vue Rangers by the score of 10-7

The match was played at Wilderspool, Warrington, (historically in the county of Lancashire). The attendance was 23,310 and receipts were £3,043.

This was the second of Wigan’s record breaking run of six consecutive Lancashire Cup victories.

It was also to be the second of two consecutive finals to be competed for by these two teams.

Background 

Overall, the number of teams entering this year’s competition increased by one with the invitation to Lancashire Amateurs (a junior/amateur club) bringing the total up to 14.

The same pre-war fixture format was retained. This season saw no bye but one "blank" or "dummy" fixture in the first round. There was also one bye but no "blank" fixture" in the second round.

As last season, all the first round matches of the competition will be played on the basis of two legged, home and away ties. However this year, the second round becomes a straightforward knock-out basis.

Competition and results

Round 1  
Involved  7 matches (with no bye and one "blank" fixture) and 14 clubs

Round 1 – second leg  
Involved  7 matches (with no bye and one "blank" fixture) and 14 clubs. These are the reverse fixture from the first leg

Round 2 – quarterfinals – first leg 
Involved 3 matches (with one bye) and 7 clubs

Round 3 – semifinals  
Involved 2 matches and 4 clubs

Final

Teams and scorers 

Scoring - Try = three (3) points - Goal = two (2) points - Drop goal = two (2) points

The road to success 
All the first round ties were played on a two leg (home and away) basis.

The first club named in each of the first round ties played the first leg at home.

the scores shown in the first round are the aggregate score over the two legs.

Notes and comments 

1 * Lancashire Amateurs were a junior (or amateur) club from Lancashire. The match was played at Watersheddings, Oldham

2 * The official St. Helens archive show as attendance of 16,000 (with 17,000 for the second leg at home) RUGBY LEAGUE projects show it as 17,000

3 * Leigh's first Lancashire Cup match at the newly completed purpose build stadium

4 * Wilderspool was the home ground of Warrington from 1883 to the end of the 2003 Summer season when they moved into the new purpose built Halliwell Jones Stadium. Wilderspool remained as a sports/Ruugby League ground and is/was used by Woolston Rovers/Warrington Wizards junior club.

The ground had a final capacity of 9,000 although the record attendance was set in a Challenge cup third round match on 13 March 1948 when 34,304 spectators saw Warrington lose to Wigan 10-13.

See also 
1947–48 Northern Rugby Football League season
Rugby league county cups

References

External links
Saints Heritage Society
1896–97 Northern Rugby Football Union season at wigan.rlfans.com
Hull&Proud Fixtures & Results 1896/1897
Widnes Vikings - One team, one passion Season In Review - 1896-97
The Northern Union at warringtonwolves.org

1947 in English rugby league
RFL Lancashire Cup